Friedrich der Grosse (spelled Große in German) is the German name for Frederick the Great, a ruler of Prussia.  It is also the name of a number of German-built ships, namely:

 , a civilian passenger ship with 10,500 ton displacement
 , a possible name of an unfinished battleship of the proposed 

Ships of Germany
German Navy ship names